Four Nights of the Full Moon directed by Sobey Martin is a 1963 Documento film, starring an international ensemble cast with Gene Tierney, Dan Dailey, and Analia Gade.

This film is considered a lost film. During production, they ran out of money. It was cut down to be a TV production. The final print of this production has been lost.

Cast
 Gene Tierney
 Dan Dailey
 Analia Gade
 Don Jame de Mora y Aragon
 Perla Cristal
 Nini Montian

External links
 

1963 films
American black-and-white films
1960s Spanish-language films
1963 short films
1960s English-language films
Lost American films
1960s lost films